Eiler Hagerup may refer to:

Eiler Eilersen Hagerup (1718-1789), Bishop of Bjørgvin and Christianssand in Norway
Eiler Hansen Hagerup (1685-1743), Bishop of Nidaros in Norway
Eiler Hagerup (politician) (1736-1795), Norwegian politician and county governor of Finnmark

See also
Hagerup, a list of people with the surname Hagerup
Eiler Hagerup Krog Prytz (disambiguation)